"Dangers on a Train" is the twenty-second and final episode of the twenty-fourth season of the American animated television series The Simpsons, and the 530th episode overall. It first aired on the Fox network in the United States on May 19, 2013. The name of the episode is a reference to the film Strangers on a Train.

Plot
As Homer and Marge's wedding anniversary approaches, Homer remembers how they celebrated their first one: by visiting an outdoor mall and riding its miniature train, "Li'l Lisa." Homer visits the mall, intending to bring Marge back for this year's anniversary, but finds that it has become a run-down wreck. Taking the dismantled train home, he enlists his bar buddies and Reverend Lovejoy to help him refurbish it. Meanwhile, Marge goes online to order a batch of Dolly Madison snack cakes for Homer, but inadvertently ends up on a site called Sassy Madison (a parody of Ashley Madison), which helps married people set up affairs. She quickly receives a deluge of invitations from perverted men; while deleting them, she finds a message from a likable guy named Ben and starts talking with him. At first she tries to brush him off, but the two soon find that they share an appreciation for the British drama series Upton Rectory (a spoof of Downton Abbey). Homer continues to work on his train project in secret, alienating Marge.

On the day of their anniversary, Homer fakes a back injury and sends Marge across Springfield to pick up a prescription for him. With her gone, he and his friends set up the train to run around the house. As she drives, Marge experiences visions of Ben, mentally pushing them away while bemoaning the state of her marriage at the same time. When she returns home, she sees the train, now renamed "Majestic Marge," and forgives Homer. Ben's wife Ramona confronts the couple over Marge's secret correspondence with Ben, but Homer and Marge explain that two people in a healthy relationship should not keep secrets from one another. Homer decides that Marge does not have to tell him how she came to know Ben, and Ramona tells Ben that the two of them are going to become closer by reviewing his computer browser history, much to his surprise. Ben returns to Sassy Madison and makes contact with a new woman, but runs away screaming when she turns out to be Selma.

Reception

Ratings
The episode received a 2.1 in the 18-49 demographic and was watched by a total of 4.52 million viewers. This made it the second most watched show on Fox's Animation Domination line up that night, beating two episodes of The Cleveland Show but losing to the one-hour Family Guy finale with 5.28 million.

Critical reception
Robert David Sullivan of The A.V. Club gave the episode a C+, saying, "Dangers on a Train’ is more standard 2013 Simpsons fare, with another trip to the bottomless well of stories about Marge feeling neglected by Homer as their 10th anniversary nears. There's no monorail-type disaster this time, and ‘Dangers on a Train’ has one of the simpler and sweeter Homer-and-Marge reconciliations."

Teresa Lopez of TV Fanatic gave the episode three out of five stars, saying, " The only thing that elevated this episode above the mundane was a Downton Abbey parody. Marge and Ben's obsession with the costume-drama Upton Rectory perfectly captured the global preoccupation with the PBS show. Seth MacFarlane also provided an amusing addition to the episode, but he pulled his usual shtick of using his Stewie voice and Sinatra-style singing, which was definitely suffering from the law of diminishing returns."

References

External links 
 
 "Dangers on a Train" at theSimpsons.com

The Simpsons (season 24) episodes
2013 American television episodes